The Louise S. McGehee School is an all-girls private, independent school in the Garden District in New Orleans, Louisiana, United States. The McGehee campus, which is one city block, has ten buildings and at least  of space.

History
The school, founded by Louise McGehee, opened in September 1912. It was originally called Mrs. Chapman's School. It later moved into a mansion in the Garden District. The 1938 Works Progress Administration New Orleans City Guide described it as one of the most popular private schools in New Orleans. "New Orleans has had a number of private schools, only a few of which, however, survived the depression. The Louise S. McGehee School for Girls, an accredited elementary and high school founded in 1912, is one of the most popular in the city." McGehee is one of the few private secular schools in New Orleans, they strive to educate their students about multiple faiths, and to foster inclusivity.

Louise S. McGehee School was founded in 1912 by Louise S. McGehee and opened in September of that year at 1439 Louisiana Avenue with thirty students. In 1929, Miss McGehee's School moved to the current location at 2343 Prytania St. and became a corporation known as the Louise S. McGehee School. In the fall of 1929, there were 209 students and classes began with the fifth grade. In 1962, a new Lower School building was dedicated for grades K through sixth and in 1973, the first Pre-Kindergarten class started school. In the 1950s, the school added grades Kindergarten through fourth grade. In the 1990s, McGehee started an Early Childhood Program "Little Gate" which is a co-educational program for ages one through four.

Pre-Hurricane Katrina the school had about 500 students. After Katrina hit in August 2005, the school resumed classes in October and by November 2005 the school had about half of its pre-Katrina enrollment.

Athletics
McGehee School athletics competes in the LHSAA.

References 
 Evans, Eli N. The Provincials: A Personal History of Jews in the South. University of North Carolina Press, 1973; rpt. 1977, 2005. , 9780807876343.
 Merrill, Ellen C. Germans Of Louisiana. Pelican Publishing, 2005. , .
 New Orleans City Guide (1938) Works Progress Administration. Re-published by the Garrett County Press, 2011. , .

References 

Private K-12 schools in New Orleans
Girls' schools in Louisiana
Independent Schools Association of the Southwest
Educational institutions established in 1912
1912 establishments in Louisiana